Dziewcza Struga  is a village in the administrative district of Gmina Rogoźno, within Oborniki County, Greater Poland Voivodeship, in west-central Poland.

The village has a population of 71.

References

Dziewcza Struga